The 1734 British general election returned members to serve in the House of Commons of the 8th Parliament of Great Britain to be summoned, after the merger of the Parliament of England and the Parliament of Scotland in 1707. Robert Walpole's increasingly unpopular Whig government lost ground to the Tories and the opposition Whigs, but still had a secure majority in the House of Commons. The Patriot Whigs were joined in opposition by a group of Whig members led by Lord Cobham known as the Cobhamites, or 'Cobham's Cubs'.

Summary of the constituencies
See 1796 British general election for details. The constituencies used were the same throughout the existence of the Parliament of Great Britain.

Dates of election
The general election was held between 22 April 1734 and 6 June 1734.

At this period elections did not take place at the same time in every constituency. The returning officer in each county or parliamentary borough fixed the precise date (see hustings for details of the conduct of the elections).

Results

Seats summary

See also
List of parliaments of Great Britain
List of MPs elected in the 1734 British general election

References
 British Electoral Facts 1832–1999, compiled and edited by Colin Rallings and Michael Thrasher (Ashgate Publishing Ltd 2000). (For dates of elections before 1832, see the footnote to Table 5.02).

1734 in politics
1734 in Great Britain
1734